Elizabeth Harrison Walker (February 21, 1897 – December 25, 1955) was the fourth and youngest child of U.S. President Benjamin Harrison, and the only child with his second wife, Mary.

Biography

Born in Indiana in 1897, she graduated from New York University School of Law in 1919 and was admitted to the bar in Indiana and New York.

On April 6, 1921, Elizabeth Harrison married James Blaine Walker (January 20, 1889 – January 15, 1978), a grandnephew of Secretary of State James G. Blaine, a member of her father's cabinet. They had 2 children, Benjamin Harrison Walker (b. 1921 d. 1995) and Jane Harrison Garfield (née Walker) (b. 1929 d. 2020).  Jane Walker married Newell Garfield, a grandson of Interior Secretary James Rudolph Garfield, and great-grandson of President James Garfield.

Jane and her husband, Newell had one daughter Eliza, but had no biological grandchildren. Their grandchildren were adopted instead. Benjamin married Elizabeth Sillcocks Walker and had two sons.

Elizabeth Harrison was the founder and publisher of Cues on the News, an investment newsletter for women.

She died from natural causes at 58 on Christmas in 1955. She was the last surviving child of Benjamin Harrison.

Notes

Sources
 Charles W. Calhoun, Benjamin Harrison, 2005, (short biography-information about Mary Dimmick Harrison).

External links

Benjamin Harrison House

1897 births
1955 deaths
21st-century American women
Benjamin Harrison
Children of presidents of the United States
Harrison family of Virginia
New York University School of Law alumni
People from Indianapolis
Lawyers from New York City
Indiana lawyers
New York (state) lawyers
20th-century American women lawyers
20th-century American lawyers